The following is a list of South Korean idol musical bands. This includes a list of boy bands and girl groups, organized by year of debut. 

Idol bands in South Korea started to appear after the success of Seo Taiji and Boys, whose debut in 1992 is considered a turning point in the history of Korean popular music. 2012 was a record year in K-pop in terms of number of rookie artists: 33 male groups and 38 girl groups debuted.

1990s

2000s

2010s

2020s

See also 
 K-pop
 Korean idol
 List of South Korean boy bands
 List of South Korean girl groups

References

External links
 

 
 
Idol groups